Julie Elliott (born 29 July 1963) is a British Labour Party politician, who was first elected Member of Parliament (MP) for Sunderland Central in 2010. Elliott served as Shadow Minister for Energy and Climate Change from October 2013 to September 2015, with specific responsibility for renewable energy, the Green Investment Bank and skills and supply chain issues. She has also served as chair of the All-Party Parliamentary Group for Rugby Union and vice-chair of the All-Party Parliamentary Group on State Pension Inequality for Women. Elliott was re-elected for the Labour Party in Sunderland Central at the 2019 general election with a majority of 2,964.

Early life 
Elliott, youngest of three children, was born in Whitburn, Sunderland, in July 1963. Her father, Harold, served as an apprentice joiner at Sunderland Shipbuilders before working as a blacksmith striker at Wearmouth Colliery.

She was educated at Seaham Northlea Comprehensive, later gaining a degree in Government and Public Policy at Newcastle Polytechnic – now known as Northumbria University.

Professional career
Elliott served as a school governor for Whitburn Comprehensive from 1991 to 2004, including a stint as chair. She also served as a governor at primary schools across Sunderland and South Tyneside.

She joined the National Asthma Campaign in 1998 as a regional organizer. In 1999, became a regional organizer for the GMB Trade Union. Her work with the union is responsible for political matters, representing members in employment tribunals and regional pay negotiations.

Political career 
Elliott became a member of the Labour Party in 1984 and worked as a regional organizer from 1993 to 1998. In 1997, she served as an agent for Tynemouth and played a key role in winning the seat for Labour for the first time since 1948.

She was elected as MP for Sunderland Central in May 2010 and continued to serve on the European Scrutiny Committee and the Business and Skills Select Committee. She was also Co-Chair of the All Party Parliamentary Group for Primary Care and Public Health.

In October 2013, Elliott became a Shadow Minister in the Shadow Department for Energy and Climate Change, with specific responsibility for renewable energy. Furthermore, she also served as Parliamentary Private Secretary to Caroline Flint

Elliott was re-elected as MP for Sunderland Central in May 2015 with a grand total of 20,959 votes and following her departure from the Front Bench in September 2015, she became a member of the Culture, Media and Sport Select Committee.

Elliott nominated Liz Kendall in the 2015 Labour Party leadership election and Caroline Flint in the deputy leadership election. 

She was elected as Chair of the PLP Backbench Housing and Planning Committee in November 2015, and served as a member of the National Policy Forum. In addition to these roles, Elliott served as Chair of the All Party Parliamentary Group on Rugby Union and Vice-Chair of the All Party Parliamentary Group on Infant Feeding and Inequalities.

She endorsed Owen Smith in the failed attempt to replace Jeremy Corbyn in the 2016 Labour Party (UK) leadership election.

Elliott was re-elected as MP for Sunderland Central in June 2017. She won 25,056 votes on a 62.1% turnout, although her majority fell by a few hundred votes compared to 2015. In July 2017 she was named Vice Chair of the All-Party Parliamentary Group on State Pension Inequality for Women – a forum which campaigns on state pension age issues. She has also been re-elected as Chair of the All Party Parliamentary Group on Rugby Union. Elliott is a supporter of Labour Friends of Palestine & the Middle East.

Elliott has consistently voted in favour of the removal of hereditary peers from the House of Lords, equal gay rights and same-sex marriage. She has also voted against university tuition fees, proposed reductions in spending on welfare benefits and culling badgers to tackle bovine tuberculosis. Elliott campaigned to remain in the European Union and consistently voted against withdrawal agreements put forward to parliament despite her constituents voting to leave. In 2019, she spoke in 6 debates and received answers to 34 written questions.

Elliott plays a key role in several Parliamentary committees and organisations, including: Member, Panel of Chairs; Treasurer, Commonwealth Parliamentary Association (CPA) UK; Member, Digital, Culture, Media and Sport Select Committee; Member, Sub-Committee for Disinformation, DCMS Select Committee; Member, Regulatory Reform Committee; Chair, PLP Northern Group of Labour MPs; Chair, PLP Backbench DFID Group; Chair, Labour Friends of Palestine and the Middle East; Chair, APPG Digital Skills; Chair, APPG Human Microbiome; Co-Chair, APPG Northern Powerhouse; Co-Chair, APPG Children's Media and the Arts.

Elliott nominated Jess Phillips in the 2020 Labour Party leadership election and Ian Murray in the deputy leadership election.

Campaigns 
Elliott has taken an active role in several campaigns over the decades, both before and after becoming an MP.

While working with the National Asthma Campaign in 1998, she urged the Government to ban smoking in public places. She later worked with the GMB to change the law around compensation paid to victims of asbestos-related diseases. She also led a campaign against the use of zero hour contracts in 2013.

Since becoming an MP Elliott has joined forces with the Sunderland Echo to successfully campaign against the closure of Sunderland Central Fire Station in 2014. Elliott is currently campaigning for a transformation of Sunderland's 'rundown railway station' and, since 2011, she has also been campaigning for a new court complex for the city.

During the 2016 EU referendum, Elliott supported the Remain campaign.

Personal life
Elliott has four children and seven grandchildren. She enjoys walking along the coastline of her constituency and watching International Rugby Union.

References

External links
Julie Elliott Labour Party profile

Living people
1963 births
21st-century British women politicians
Alumni of Northumbria University
Female members of the Parliament of the United Kingdom for English constituencies
Labour Friends of Palestine and the Middle East
Labour Party (UK) MPs for English constituencies
People from Sunderland
Politicians from Tyne and Wear
UK MPs 2010–2015
UK MPs 2015–2017
UK MPs 2017–2019
UK MPs 2019–present
21st-century English women
21st-century English people